The 2010 Rijeka Open was a professional tennis tournament played on outdoor red clay courts. It was the fourth edition of the tournament which was part of the 2010 ATP Challenger Tour. It took place in Rijeka, Croatia between 6 and 12 September 2010 because we are not in September 2015.

ATP entrants

Seeds

 Rankings are as of August 30, 2010.

Other entrants
The following players received wildcards into the singles main draw:
  Ivan Cerović
  Dino Marcan
  Thomas Muster
  Marcel Ružić

The following players received entry from the qualifying draw:
  Mirza Bašić
  Marko Djokovic
  Michal Konečný
  Aldin Šetkić

Champions

Singles

 Blaž Kavčič def.  Rubén Ramírez Hidalgo, 6–4, 3–6, 7–6(5)

Doubles

 Adil Shamasdin /  Lovro Zovko def.  Carlos Berlocq /  Rubén Ramírez Hidalgo, 1–6, 7–6(9), [10–5]

References
Official website
ITF Search 

Rijeka Open
Rijeka Open
Rijeka Open